José Duarte (born July 6, 1980) is a Brazilian football striker who currently plays for Shenyang Shenbei in the China League One.

He previously played for Maccabi Tel Aviv, Anapolina, Club Brugge, Hapoel Be'er Sheva, Hapoel Nazareth Illit, Hapoel Kfar Saba, Guangzhou Pharmaceutical  and Chongqing Lifan.

José transferred to Tianjin Runyulong in March 2011.

Honours
Belgian Cup (1):
2002
Belgian Supercup (1):
2002

References

External links

Stats in Belgium

1980 births
Living people
Brazilian footballers
Brazilian expatriate footballers
Israeli Premier League players
R.W.D. Molenbeek players
Club Brugge KV players
Hapoel Be'er Sheva F.C. players
Maccabi Tel Aviv F.C. players
Hapoel Nof HaGalil F.C. players
Hapoel Kfar Saba F.C. players
Bnei Yehuda Tel Aviv F.C. players
Expatriate footballers in Israel
Guangzhou F.C. players
Chongqing Liangjiang Athletic F.C. players
Cruzeiro Esporte Clube players
Goiás Esporte Clube players
Expatriate footballers in China
Brazilian expatriate sportspeople in China
Belgian Pro League players
Expatriate footballers in Belgium
Chinese Super League players
China League One players
Association football forwards